Shannon S. Erickson (born April 21, 1963) is an American politician. She is a member of the South Carolina House of Representatives from the 124th District, serving since 2007. She is a member of the Republican party.

Erickson is Chair of the House Education and Public Works Committee.

Early life and education
Shannon was born and raised in Florence, South Carolina. Her father was a member of the United States Army, stationed in Korea. While in high school, Shannon was an active member of Episcopal Youth Group.

References

External links
 https://justfacts.votesmart.org/candidate/biography/101096/shannon-erickson

Living people
1963 births
Republican Party members of the South Carolina House of Representatives
People from Florence, South Carolina
University of South Carolina alumni
21st-century American politicians

Women state legislators in South Carolina